Space Is the Place may refer to:
 Space Is the Place, Afrofuturist science fiction film
 Space Is the Place (soundtrack), an album by Sun Ra and His Intergalactic Solar Arkestra
 Space Is the Place (Sun Ra album), 1973
 Space Is the Place (Dahl/Andersen/Christensen album), 2012
 "Space Is the Place," a song by Spacehog from their album Resident Alien